Tragic Spell (Italian: Incantesimo tragico (Oliva)) is a 1951 Italian historical melodrama film directed by Mario Sequi and starring María Félix, Rossano Brazzi and Massimo Serato.

It was shot at Cinecittà Studios in Rome. The film's sets were designed by the art director Saverio D'Eugenio.

Cast
 María Félix as Oliva  
 Rossano Brazzi as Pietro  
 Massimo Serato as Berto  
 Charles Vanel as Bastiano 
 Irma Gramatica as Grandmother  
 Giulio Donnini as L'orafo Golia  
 Italia Marchesini as Adele  
 Fiorella Betti as Cleofe  
 Fausto Guerzoni as Girasole  
 Wanda Carpentieri as Berto's Girlfriend  
 Franco Coop as Cavaliere  
 Maria Zanoli as Witch  
 Ada Dondini as Gesuina  
 Giovanni Barrella 
 Paola Quattrini as Camilla  
 Vittoria Febbi as Maria  
 Maria Piazzai as Zaira  
 Angelo Dessy as Farmer  
 Lita Perez 
 Christina Thorer 
 Ettore Vincelli 
 Anna Maestri as Oliva's Maid  
 Armando Annuale as Orator at Engagement Party  
 Nino Capozzi as Party Guest

References

Bibliography
 Darby, William. Masters of Lens and Light: A Checklist of Major Cinematographers and Their Feature Films. Scarecrow Press, 1991.

External links
 

1951 films
1950s historical drama films
Italian historical drama films
1950s Italian-language films
Films set in the 19th century
Films directed by Mario Sequi
Films shot at Cinecittà Studios
Lux Film films
Italian black-and-white films
Melodrama films
1950s Italian films